Silvaneh (also Romanized as Sīlvāneh; also known as Sīlvānā, Salvanagh, Selvānā, Selvānaq, and Silvana) is a city in, and the capital of, Silvaneh District of Urmia County, West Azerbaijan province, Iran. At the 2006 census, its population was 1,350 in 243 households. The following census in 2011 counted 1,490 people in 396 households. The latest census in 2016 showed a population of 1,614 people in 436 households.

References 

Urmia County

Cities in West Azerbaijan Province

Populated places in West Azerbaijan Province

Populated places in Urmia County